Selly Oak railway station is a railway station in Selly Oak in Birmingham, England, on the Cross-City Line between Redditch, Birmingham and Lichfield.

History
It opened on 3 April 1876 on the Midland Railway's Birmingham West Suburban Railway branch to serve the burgeoning suburbs of Selly Oak and Bournbrook. The entrance to the station was on Heeley Road.

On 20 August 1883, a goods train from Granville Street to Lifford was passing over the bridge over the canal at Selly Oak station when at a speed of  it derailed and damaged much of the wooden railing of the bridge. The engine remained on the bridge, but two of the wagons broke through the wooden fencing and tumbled down the embankment.

Originally built as a single track line, the route through Selly Oak was doubled between 1883 and 1885 when the Midland Railway connected the northern end of the line though to Birmingham New Street station. The viaduct north of the station which carried the old line over the canal and then the Bristol Road could not be widened so it was replaced on a new alignment. The line continued on its deviation north of the original line until ¼ mile south of Selly Oak station where a new shorter viaduct was reached. The new station buildings on the up platform comprised a central booking hall with waiting rooms for ladies and gentlemen on either side, and offices and porters' room. The down platform had a simple waiting room.

The station area has changed considerably since the Midland Railway days and lost virtually all its original features as the station was completely rebuilt by British Rail in 1978 to designs of the architect John Broome along with the others on this line when the Cross-City route was commissioned.  Prior to the rebuild, the station had only received a limited service (mainly at peak hours) for much of the 1960s and 1970s.

On 11 April 1993, a railway employee at the station was threatened with sticks and two masked men stole takings of hundreds of pounds. The station received a £85,000 facelift in 1994 with the number of car park spaces expanded from 50 to 86, new lighting, fencing and closed circuit TV

Facilities
The site has recently been expanded with the addition of a new car park with 93 free spaces, making Selly Oak station a new Park and Ride site. The station and line are on an embankment.

Pedestrian and vehicular access to the station is via Bristol Rd (B384) on the northbound side, and via Heeley Rd on the southbound side. Access between platforms is via a covered overhead bridge, with lifts available. The overhead bridge has views of Bournbrook, The University of Birmingham and the city centre itself.

The station is equipped with real-time information departure boards which were previously installed in 2006 by former Cross City Line franchise holder Central Trains. There are automated ticket machines and windowed ticket booths.

Services
The station is only served by Cross City Line trains operated by West Midlands Trains, which are currently Class 323 electrical multiple units. Trains call every 10–20 minutes each way during the day on Mondays to Saturdays and up to every half hour on Sundays.

Station masters

Nathaniel Dottoms 1876 - 1877 (afterwards station master at Somerset Road)
Thomas Viney 1877 - 1881  (afterwards station master at Coaley Junction)
W.G. Stevenson 1881 - 1882 (formerly station master at Church Road, afterwards station master at South Wigston)
James Dingley 1882 - 1883 (afterwards station master at Coughton)
R. Harwood 1883 - 1885 
J.H. Marston 1885 - 1886 (afterwards station master at South Wigston)
J. Hull 1886 - 1888 (formerly station master at Short Heath)
William Robert Ambler 1888 - 1890 (formerly station master at Somerset Road)
J.E. Dann 1890 - 1891 
Henry Lewis 1891 - 1902 (formerly station master at Somerset Road, afterwards station master at Ystalyfera)
John H. Brayne 1902 - 1904 (formerly station master at Weston-on-Trent, afterwards station master at Kings Heath)
W.H. Baines 1904 - 1908 (afterwards station master at Willenhall)
C.W. West 1908 - ???? (afterwards station master at Heeley)
E. Meredith ca. 1914
Samuel Burdett from 1935 formerly station master at King's Cliffe)
Albert White ???? - 1948
H.J. Turner 1948 - 1954 (formerly station master at Camp Hill)
W. Close ???? - 1959 (afterwards station master at Portishead, Somerset)
W.H. Shepperson 1959 - ???? (formerly station master at Sharnbrook)

References

External links

Rail Around Birmingham and the West Midlands: Selly Oak railway station
Railways of Warwickshire entry

Railway stations in Birmingham, West Midlands
DfT Category D stations
Former Midland Railway stations
Railway stations in Great Britain opened in 1876
Railway stations served by West Midlands Trains
Selly Oak
John Broome railway stations